The Spam Museum is an admission-free museum in Austin, Minnesota dedicated to Spam, a brand of canned precooked meat products made by Hormel Foods Corporation. The museum tells the history of the Hormel company, the origin of Spam, and its place in world culture.

History

The Spam Museum originated in January 1991 as the Hormel Foods First Century Museum, when Hormel opened a small storefront company museum in celebration of the company's 100 year anniversary.  Located in Austin's Oak Park Mall, Hormel later re-branded it as the Spam Museum.

A much-larger Spam-focused museum opened in September 2001.  The 16,500-square foot space included a theater, historical displays, family activities and games, and a gift shop.  The lobby of the museum featured a wall of Spam with more than 3,300 Spam cans and, for many years, the theatre showed a short film entitled "SPAM: A Love Story." In September 2014, the museum temporarily closed while it moved to a new downtown location.

Exhibits and galleries

The museum re-opened on 22 April 2016 at its new location at 101 3rd Ave NE.

The location in downtown Austin is approximately 14,000 square feet in size and comprises seven main galleries.  These include Can Central, "the heart of the museum"; the World Market, where visitors can learn about the advertising and use of Spam and Spam recipes from 44 different nations; a World War II-themed exhibit explaining the importance of Spam as a staple for American troops; and Spam Brand 101, an interactive exhibit where visitors learn about 15 varieties of Spam and families are able to compete in the "assembly" of mock cans of Spam. Many of the exhibits include games, interactive videos, and hands-on activities.

The Spam Shop offers hundreds of Spam-branded items and gifts. Volunteer guides - known as Spambassadors - offer visitors small bits of Spam on a toothpick or pretzel stick, commonly known as Spamples.

Pop Culture
The Spam Museum is a featured stop in the Dan Gutman book series Genius Files.

Gallery

See also
Hormel Historic Home - Museum and historic home in Austin focusing on the Hormel family

References

External links
 
 Austin Convention & Visitors Bureau

1991 establishments in Minnesota
Food museums in the United States
Museums in Mower County, Minnesota
Museums established in 1991
Buildings and structures in Austin, Minnesota
Spam (food)
Roadside attractions in Minnesota